A bird box is a man-made enclosure, also called a birdhouse or a nest box, provided for birds or other animals to nest in.

Bird Box may also refer to:

Bird Box (novel), a 2014 post-apocalyptic novel and the debut novel by American writer and singer Josh Malerman
Bird Box (film), a 2018 film directed by Susanne Bier, based on the novel
 Bird Box Inc. (food), a restaurant opened June 2019 in North Hollywood, California
"Bird Box", a 2019 song by American rapper Cupcakke